The Henry Gurney Schools are centres established in 1949 under Juvenile Courts Act 1947 [Act 90] to care for young offenders in Malaysia, and were known as High Moral Schools before 15 May 1950.

List of Henry Gurney schools
 Henry Gurney School, Telok Mas, Malacca (boys & girls)
 Henry Gurney School, Kota Kinabalu, Sabah (all-girls)
 Henry Gurney School, Keningau, Sabah (all-boys)
 Henry Gurney School, Puncak Borneo, Sarawak (all-boys)
 Henry Gurney School, Batu Gajah, Perak (all-girls)

Programs
The rehabilitation programmes in these centres are divided into four stages:
 Orientation Programme
 Induction 
 Orientation
 Assessment 
 Strengthening Self-Personality Programme
 Spiritual Module
 Academic Module
 Counselling Module
 Sports and Recreation Module
 Vocational Training
 Sewing
 Craft
 Batik
 Baking
 Pre-free Programme

References

External links
 "Sekolah Henry Gurney Wanita Batu Gajah" (in Malaysian)

Secondary schools in Malaysia
Publicly funded schools in Malaysia
Vocational colleges in Malaysia
Prisons in Malaysia
Youth detention centers
Educational institutions established in 1949
1949 establishments in Malaya
Boys' schools in Malaysia
Girls' schools in Malaysia